The 1866 Maine gubernatorial election was held on September 10, 1866. Republican candidate and war hero Joshua Chamberlain defeated the Democratic candidate Eben F. Pillsbury.

General election

Candidates

Republican 

 Joshua Chamberlain

During the American Civil War, Chamberlain played a crucial role at the Battle of Gettysburg. This gave Chamberlain a war hero status.

Democratic 

 Eben F. Pillsbury

Results 
The extremely popular Chamberlain was able to win election to a one year term as governor. Chamberlain won a majority of 27,687 votes, trouncing his Democratic opponent.

References 

Maine gubernatorial elections
Maine
1866 Maine elections